Meyer's goshawk (Accipiter meyerianus) is a species of bird of prey in the family Accipitridae. It is found in the Moluccas, New Guinea, the Bismarck Archipelago and the Solomon Islands.
Its natural habitats are subtropical or tropical moist lowland forest and subtropical or tropical moist montane forest.

The common name commemorates  Adolf Bernard Meyer (1840–1911), a German anthropologist and ornithologist who collected in the Dutch East Indies.

References

Meyer's goshawk
Birds of the Maluku Islands
Birds of New Guinea
Birds of the Bismarck Archipelago
Birds of the Solomon Islands
Meyer's goshawk
Taxonomy articles created by Polbot